Lansdowne House Airport  is located  southwest of the First Nations community of Neskantaga (Lansdowne House), Ontario, Canada.

Airlines and destinations

The airport services small turboprop aircraft from an unmarked gravel runway.

References

External links

Certified airports in Kenora District